Thomas McKnight (born 1941) is a U.S. artist.

He was born in 1941 in Lawrence, Kansas.

He attended Wesleyan University, a small liberal arts college in Middletown, Connecticut, where he was one of only five art majors. He spent his junior year in Paris.

After  a  year of  graduate  work in art history at Columbia University, in 1964 McKnight found a job at Time Magazine where he would work for eight years, interrupted by a two-year stint in the U. S. Army in South Korea.

In 1972 McKnight left Time, summered on the Greek island of Mykonos, and commenced painting in earnest.  In 1979 in Mykonos, McKnight met Renate, a vacationing Austrian student, and married the following year.

Throughout the 1980s McKnight's art, mainly limited edition serigraph prints, became increasingly popular.

In 1994 he was commissioned by the White House to paint the first of three images for President Bill Clinton’s official Christmas card. One of these, "White House Red Room", was used as the cover of a Lands' End catalog, which sold both the art and the original as one of the Christmas gift items.
 
McKnight's work is represented in the permanent collection of New York's Metropolitan Museum of Art, as well as in the Smithsonian Institution.

McKnight and his wife live in Litchfield, Connecticut.

References

External links
Thomas McKnight Paintings, Prints, Silkscreens, Etchings, Serigraphs | Thomas McKnight Gallery, the Official Website

1941 births
Living people
Columbia University alumni
Wesleyan University alumni
20th-century American painters
American male painters
20th-century American male artists